The Testament of Sister New Devil is a Japanese manga series written by Tetsuto Uesu and illustrated by Kashiwa Miyako. Adapted from the light novel series of the same name, the series follows Basara Tōjō, and his two little sisters, Mio Naruse and Maria Naruse.

The manga is serialized monthly in Kadokawa Shoten's shōnen manga magazine Shōnen Ace. The series has been licensed for publication in North America by Seven Seas Entertainment.

Volumes

The Testament of Sister New Devil

|}

The Testament of Sister New Devil: Storm!

See also

List of The Testament of Sister New Devil episodes

References 

Testament of Sister New Devil, The